The Chincha Province is one of five provinces of the Ica Region of Peru. The capital of the province is the city of Chincha Alta.

History

Geography

Boundaries
North: Lima Region
East: Huancavelica Region
South: Pisco Province
West: Pacific Ocean

Political division 
The Chincha Province is divided into eleven districts (singular: distrito), each of which is headed by a mayor (alcalde):

Districts
 Alto Larán
 Chavín
 Chincha Alta
 Chincha Baja
 El Carmen
 Grocio Prado
 Pueblo Nuevo
 San Juan de Yanac
 San Pedro de Huacarpana
 Sunampe
 Tambo de Mora

See also 
 Administrative divisions of Peru

Provinces of the Ica Region